Sunup to Sundown is an album by guitarist Kenny Burrell that was released on the Contemporary label in 1991.

Reception

The Allmusic review by Scott Yanow noted: "Guitarist Kenny Burrell has a strong all-around showcase on this release from Contemporary ... Burrell swings harder than he usually does when paying tribute to the past, coming up with fresh statements on the varied material ... This set serves as an excellent introduction to Kenny Burrell's enjoyable brand of straightahead playing."

Track listing 
 "Out There" (Llew Matthews) – 5:12
 "Sunup to Sundown" (Norman Mapp) – 7:56
 "Roni's Decision" (Cedar Walton) – 6:30
 "I'm Old Fashioned" (Jerome Kern, Johnny Mercer) – 6:58
 "Autumn Leaves" (Joseph Kosma, Jacques Prévert, Mercer) – 6:48
 "Smile" (Charlie Chaplin, John Turner, Geoffrey Parsons) – 5:50
 "Love Dance" (Ivan Lins, Vítor Martins, Paul Williams) – 5:22
 "Speak Low" (Kurt Weill, Ogden Nash) – 6:05
 "Lucky to Be Me" (Leonard Bernstein, Betty Comden, Adolph Green) – 5:10

Personnel 
Kenny Burrell – acoustic guitar, electric guitar, arranger
Cedar Walton – piano
Rufus Reid – bass
Lewis Nash – drums

References 

Kenny Burrell albums
1991 albums
Contemporary Records albums